INS Pondicherry (M61) was a Pondicherry class minesweeper in service with the Indian Navy, built by the Sredne-Nevskiy Shipyard at Saint Petersburg in Russia.  She was the lead ship of this class. Pondicherry served the Indian Navy from 1978 to 2007. She was named after Puducherry, a union territory of India which at the time was known as Pondicherry.

On 15 February 1989 Pondicherry was painted white and used as the Presidential yacht for the Fleet Review by President R. Venkataraman. She reverted to her normal role and colour on completion. She was based at Mumbai.

References

Pondicheery (Natya 1) class at Bharat-Rakshak. Retrieved on 2009-04-29.

Pondicherry-class minesweepers
Ships built in the Soviet Union
India–Soviet Union relations
1978 ships
Ships built at Sredne-Nevskiy Shipyard